Jeet Heer is a Canadian author, comics critic, literary critic and journalist of Sikh origin. He is a national affairs correspondent for The Nation magazine and a former staff writer at The New Republic. As of 2014, he was writing a doctoral thesis at York University in Toronto. The publications he has written for include The National Post, The New Yorker, The Paris Review, and Virginia Quarterly Review. Heer was a member of the 2016 jury for the Scotiabank Giller Prize. His anthology A Comic Studies Reader, with Kent Worcester, won the 2010 Rollins Award.

Selected works
 Arguing Comics: Literary Masters on a Popular Medium (edited with Kent Worcester) (2004)
 A Comics Studies Reader (edited with Kent Worcester) (2008)
 The Superhero Reader (edited with Kent Worcester and Charles Hatfield) (2013) 
 Too Asian: Racism, Privilege, and Post-Secondary Education (with Michael C.K. Ma, Davina Bhandar and R.J. Gilmour, eds. Toronto: Between the Lines, 2012.
 In Love with Art: Françoise Mouly's Adventures in Comics with Art Spiegelman (2013)
 Sweet Lechery'' (2014)

References

External links
 
 

Canadian literary critics
Comics critics
Living people
The New Republic people
Year of birth missing (living people)
York University alumni
Canadian writers of Asian descent
Canadian people of Indian descent